Several ships have been named :

 , also called Takao Maru, a ship of the Tokugawa shogunate Navy in the Boshin War
 , a transport ship of the early Imperial Japanese Navy
 , an unprotected cruiser in the early Imperial Japanese Navy
 Japanese battlecruiser Takao, a projected  of the Imperial Japanese Navy that was canceled under the terms of Washington Naval Treaty
 , a auxiliary minesweeper of the Imperial Japanese Navy in World War II
 , a auxiliary submarine chaser of the Imperial Japanese Navy in World War II
 , a transport ship of the Imperial Japanese Army in World War II

See also 
 Takao (disambiguation)

Imperial Japanese Navy ship names
Japanese Navy ship names